The Mark 34 torpedo (initially Mine Mk 44, technically Mk 34 mod 1) was a United States torpedo developed that entered service in 1948. It was an improved version of the Mark 24 FIDO passive acoustic homing torpedo developed during World War II for launch from fixed-wing aircraft.  The principal differences from the Mark 24 were the use of two propulsion batteries, which could be used in parallel while the torpedo was searching for a target to provide greater endurance and in series to provide greater speed in attack mode.

Approximately 4,050 were produced between 1948 and 1954 before production was ceased. The torpedo was replaced in U.S. service with the Mark 43 torpedo around 1958.

Specifications
 Length : 
 Diameter : 
 Fin span : 
 Weight : 
 Warhead :  HBX
 Speed :
  (search mode)
  (attack mode)
 Range and endurance :

Notes

References
 

Torpedoes of the United States